Come to Jesus may refer to:

 "Come to Jesus" (American Gods), a television episode
 Come to Jesus, a religious tract by Christopher Newman Hall